Cassandra Jean Whitehead (born October 5, 1985), also known as Cassandra Jean Amell, is an American actress, model, and beauty pageant queen from Houston, Texas. Jean attended Texas A&M University–Corpus Christi.

Beauty pageants
Jean competed in the Miss Texas Teen USA pageant from 2002 to 2004. She was a semifinalist in both 2003 and 2004 and held the local title of Miss Houston Teen USA in 2003. In these pageants, she competed alongside future Miss Texas USA Lauren Lanning (2006) and Magen Ellis (2007). Jean (as Cassandra Whitehead) won Miss Corpus Christi 2004, a title held by Eva Longoria in 1998. She made the top 10 at Miss Texas USA 2005. 

Whitehead competed in the Miss California USA 2008 pageant but was disqualified due to her appearance on America's Next Top Model. In June 2009, the Miss Universe Organization changed the rule barring former reality show contestants from competing in state pageants. This rule change would benefit Cycle 12 finalist Natalie Pack, who later won Miss California USA 2012 and The Voice contestant DeAnna Johnson, who won the title of Miss Georgia USA 2017. 

In 2008, Whitehead was a judge for the Miss Newport Beach pageant. Whitehead was a 19-year-old student at Texas A&M University–Corpus Christi while participating in America's Next Top Model.

America's Next Top Model
Jean was the first girl chosen for the top thirteen to compete on the UPN reality television show America's Next Top Model, Cycle 5 however quit the competition outside of judging panel during the fourth episode. She became very emotional during the makeovers in episode three, wherein her long, dark brown hair was cut extremely short and bleached blonde. During the next judging round, host Tyra Banks was still not pleased with Jean's haircut, wanting to make it even shorter and scheduling a time to have it redone but Jean refused. Claiming that the producers gave her one night to consider her options, she walked out the following morning. During her time on Top Model, Jean took two photos and received one third call-out and one first call-out. Jean's choice to quit and Sarah Rhoades' elimination during the same week had later forced a non-elimination episode where together both Jayla Rubinelli and Nicole Linkletter (who eventually won over Nik Pace) survived their first-ever bottom two appearances each. Jean made an appearance in The Cycle 5 Reunion, America's Next Top Model: Where the Girls Are, and America's Next Top Model: Exposed. In 2009, she was voted one of the most memorable contestants by AOL Canada entertainment.

Acting career
Jean appears in the film 2 Dudes and a Dream (2009). She has had guest roles on several TV shows including One Tree Hill, The Middleman, CSI: Miami, CSI: Crime Scene Investigation, Las Vegas, Hannah Montana, Twenty-Four Seven (MTV), America's Next Producer (TV Guide Network), and a speaking role on Mad Men.

Jean hosted Lucky Strike's Bowl for a Cause, MySpace and Tommy Lee's Super Bowl XL Event, Miss Corpus Christi 2006, America's Next Top Model Diva Dish along with "Red Carpet Makeovers" for the Tyra Banks Show. She also appeared on the game show 1 vs. 100 on February 15, 2008, winning $500,000.

Jean played the character of Nora Fries in Elseworlds, the 2018 Arrowverse crossover event between The CW series The Flash, Supergirl, and Arrow.

Filmography

Film

Television

Personal life
Jean married actor Stephen Amell on December 25, 2012, while they were on a vacation in the Caribbean. They have a daughter Mavi, born in 2013, and a son, Bowen Auguste Amell, born on May 13, 2022.

References

External links
 

1985 births
21st-century American actresses
Actresses from Houston
America's Next Top Model contestants
Female models from Texas
Beauty pageant contestants from Texas
Living people
Texas A&M University–Corpus Christi alumni